Zamanabad (also Romanized as Zamānābād; also known as Zamānābād-e Emām Qolīkhān) is a village in Tork-e Gharbi Rural District, Jowkar District, Malayer County, Hamadan Province, Iran. At the 2006 census, its population was 1,307, in 270 families.

References 

Populated places in Malayer County